Stefanelli is a surname of Italian origin. The name refers to:
Joe Stefanelli (painter) (1921-2017)
Benito Stefanelli (1929–1999), Italian film actor and stuntman
Joe Stefanelli (b. 1960), American actor and musician
Mattia Stefanelli (b. 1993), Sammarinese footballer
Nicholas Stefanelli, US chef and restaurant owner
Nicolás Stefanelli, (b. 1994), Argentine footballer
Pietro Stefanelli (1835–1919), Italian entomologist
Simonetta Stefanelli (b. 1954), Italian actress
Teodor V. Ștefanelli (1849-1920), Romanian historian